Pain Hustlers is an upcoming American conspiracy drama film directed by David Yates from a screenplay by Wells Tower, based on a 2018 New York Times Magazine article, "The Pain Hustlers", by Evan Hughes and his subsequent novel The Hard Sell released in 2022. It stars Emily Blunt, Chris Evans, Andy García, Catherine O'Hara, Jay Duplass, Brian d'Arcy James, and Chloe Coleman.

Plot
High school dropout Liza Drake lands a job with a failing pharmaceutical start-up in a yellowing strip mall in Central Florida, where she soon finds herself at the center of a criminal conspiracy with deadly consequences.

Cast
 Emily Blunt as Liza Drake
 Chris Evans
 Andy García
 Catherine O'Hara
 Jay Duplass
 Brian d'Arcy James
 Chloe Coleman

Production
On August 18, 2021, Sony Pictures announced the development of an untitled film directed by David Yates and written by Wells Tower, based on the Evan Hughes’ New York Times Magazine article, “The Pain Hustlers” from May 2, 2018  and his subsequent novel The Hard Sell released in January 2022. It is a co-production between Grey Matter Productions and Wychwood Pictures. Yates produced the film along with Lawrence Grey and Yvonne Walcott Yates. In May 2022, Emily Blunt joined the cast and Netflix acquired the film, which was titled Pain Hustlers, in a deal worth at least $50 million. In July, Chris Evans came on board to star. In August, Andy Garcia, Catherine O’Hara, Jay Duplass, Brian d'Arcy James, and Chloe Coleman were added to the cast. Production began in late August.

References

External links
 

American drama films
English-language Netflix original films
Films about businesspeople
Films based on non-fiction books
Films directed by David Yates
Films scored by James Newton Howard
Upcoming English-language films
Upcoming Netflix original films
Upcoming films